Encyclopedia of Sound is the fifth studio album by American instrumental rock band Los Straitjackets, released in 2001 by LoveCat Music.

Track listing
All music was composed by Danny Amis, Eddie Angel, Pete Curry and Jimmy Lester.

"Furious" – 1:35
"Road Rage" – 1:55
"Candy Rock" – 1:38
"Kaboom!" – 2:00
"California Fun" – 1:19
"Switchblade Stroll" – 1:21
"Cactus Walk" – 2:05
"Arizona Sunset" – 2:12
"Country Squier" (electric) – 1:23
"Country Squier" (acoustic) – 1:11
"Golden Nugget" – 1:20
"Heavy Bag" – 1:06
"Cropdustin'" – 1:32
"Cantina" (electric) – 1:58
"Cantina" (acoustic) – 2:00
"Sombrero" – 1:29
"Onion Dip" – 3:02
"Pot Liquor" – 1:46
"Man from S.W.A.M.P" – 2:52
"Dipsy Doodle" – 1:53
"Take the 405" – 1:33
"Fuzzy Nova" – 2:17

Personnel
Los Straitjackets
Danny Amis – guitar
Eddie Angel – guitar
Pete Curry – bass
Jimmy Lester – drums
Additional personnel
Mark Neill – production
Carol Sue Baker – arrangements

References

Los Straitjackets albums
2001 albums